Bournemouth by-election may refer to:

 1940 Bournemouth by-election
 1945 Bournemouth by-election
 1952 Bournemouth East and Christchurch by-election
 1954 Bournemouth West by-election
 1977 Bournemouth East by-election